Oncideres gemmata is a species of beetle in the family Cerambycidae. It was described by Dillon and Dillon in 1946. It is known from Brazil, Colombia and French Guiana.

References

gemmata
Beetles described in 1946